Michael Massey Robinson (1744 – 22 December 1826) was a poet and author of the first published verse in Australia.

Biography

Legal troubles
Robinson was an educated man and appears to have practised as a lawyer. In February 1796 he was charged at the Old Bailey, London, for attempting to extort money from James Oldham, a Holborn ironmonger. He was found guilty and sentenced to death. The death sentence was changed to transportation, and he arrived at Sydney on the ship Barwell on 18 May 1798. Richard Dore, the judge-advocate, who had come out on the same vessel, stated that Robinson could be very useful to him and applied for his conditional emancipation. This was granted by Governor Hunter, and nearly two years later Dore made an application on Robinson's behalf for an absolute pardon. Robinson had been his clerk and had conducted himself properly in the meantime, but the second application was refused. In August 1803 Governor King mentioned in a dispatch that Robinson had committed perjury and had been ordered to be transported to Norfolk Island. This sentence, however, was not carried out at the time on account of the difficulty of finding another assistant for the judge-advocate. Governor King sent Robinson to Norfolk Island in 1805, but in December 1806 he was back in Sydney.

Career
In April 1810 he was made first clerk of the government secretary's office, and in this year published the first of his patriotic odes, "Ode on His Majesty's Birthday", 1810. This and the 19 other odes published on the King's and Queen's birthdays between 1810 and 1820 were first printed in the Sydney Gazette, and were then published separately, printed on three sides of a large folder. Another ode for the First of January 1811 was published as a broadside. "An Ode for His Majesty's Birthday", which was printed in the Sydney Gazette for 18 August 1821, does not appear to have been printed separately. Governor Macquarie took Robinson up and encouraged him, and he appears to have held to a straight course for the rest of his life. In July 1819 he was appointed provost-marshal but resigned this position in May 1821. In December of this year he advertised in the Sydney Gazette that he proposed to issue a volume of his poems at £1 1s. per copy. Similar advertisements appeared in 1822, 1824 and 1825, but the volume was never published. He continued to be in the employ of the government for the remainder of his life, and at the time of his death on 22 December 1826 he was principal clerk in the police office. He was married and was survived by his wife, a son and a daughter. A list of his odes will be found in Serle's A Bibliography of Australasian Poetry and Verse.

See also
List of convicts transported to Australia

References
 
 Clarke, Donovan, “Michael Massey Robinson, (1744-1826),” Australian Dictionary of Biography, accessed 13 June 2019
 Mackaness, George, ed. (1946). Odes of Michael Massey Robinson: First Poet Laureate of Australia (1754-1826). Dubbo, N.S.W. : Review Publications.

Notes

1744 births
1826 deaths
Convicts transported to Australia
English emigrants to colonial Australia
English male poets
19th-century Australian public servants
19th-century Australian lawyers
19th-century Australian poets